Suttirat Anne Larlarb (born 1971)
is an American costume designer, art director and production designer.

Life

Larlarb's parents are both Thai, and came to the US as Fulbright scholars. Her father went on to become a heart surgeon.
Larlarb was born in North Carolina
and raised in Ventura County, California.  She was interested in drawing from an early age, and attended Stanford University where she studied studio art, before winning a Jacob K. Javits Fellowship and entering Yale University's School of Drama MFA program, where she studied under Ming Cho Lee. 

Larlarb moved to London after graduating, and worked as Assistant Designer, responsible for sets and costumes, to theatrical designer Richard Hudson. The first major film on which she worked was Danny Boyle's The Beach; Larlarb has worked many times with Boyle since, both in film productions (Sunshine, Slumdog Millionaire, 127 Hours and Trance), theatrical productions (Frankenstein), and for the 2012 Summer Olympics opening ceremony in London.

Larlarb was Designer of the 2012 Summer Olympics opening ceremony, together with Mark Tildesley. She also designed the costumes and the 'dove bikes'.
She spoke of the creative brainstorming process in developing the ceremony between Boyle, Tildesley and writer Frank Cottrell Boyce: "It was so open. It could be anything.  We were bouncing around every idea that came into your head about what was essentially British.  Not being British, I could represent what the world thought Britain meant. Our mantra was that everything should feel human-scale: individual and idiosyncratic, less about slickness and perfection."
For her work on the ceremony, Larlarb was listed as one of "London's 1000 most influential people 2012" by the London Evening Standard, which commented that "the extraordinary dove bikes [were] her proudest achievement."

Selected stage work
 Assistant Designer, responsible for sets and costumes, to theatrical designer Richard Hudson on several operas:
 Khovanshchina at the Opéra Bastille in Paris
 Tamerlano at the Maggio Musicale in Florence
 Ernani at the Vienna State Opera
 Costume Designer, Frankenstein at the National Theatre, London
 Larlarb's stage design work was also included in the exhibition "Curtain Call: Celebrating A Century of Women Designing for Live Performance" at the New York Public Library of Performing Arts at the Lincoln Center, New York
 Larlarb was the Costume Designer for Anna Shapiro's Broadway revival of Of Mice and Men in 2014.
 Costume Designer, Waitress at the American Repertory Theater, Cambridge and Broadway.
 Costume designer for the 2022 Macbeth revival directed by Sam Gold at the Longacre Theatre

Filmography

References

External links
 
 National Portrait Gallery video interview with Larlarb and Mark Tildesley about the London 2012 Olympics opening ceremony
 MSNBC video interview with Larlarb about the London 2012 Olympics opening ceremony
 Larlarb's resumé at her agents
 TIME interview with Larlarb about the Olympics opening ceremony

1971 births
American art directors
American costume designers
American production designers
Living people
People from North Carolina
People from Ventura County, California
Stanford University alumni
Yale University alumni
Women production designers